The King's Daughters is a 2000 French period drama film directed by Patricia Mazuy. It was screened in the Un Certain Regard section at the 2000 Cannes Film Festival. It was adapted from the novel La maison d’Esther by Yves Dangerfield.

Plot
In March 1685, Louis XIV’s final wife Madame de Maintenon wishes to set up a boarding school for young daughters of noble families that have fallen on hard times, the Maison royale de Saint-Louis, a school where girls receive a pious but liberal education. The first difficulty is that the students from the provinces all speak different regional languages and dialects and the first task is to teach them all to speak a standardised Parisian French.

After a few years of indifference, the school’s first aims prove impossible to attain. An important crisis arises from a performance by the students of an extract from Iphigenie by Racine. This provokes too much passion among the actors and so Madame de Maintenon asks Racine to write her a play for her students that praises virtue – this proves to be Esther. The students put on the new play and, when the king and his court attend the production, Madame de Maintenon realises that this had made the nobles of the court view her protégées as targets for seduction and marriage. Marriage proposals mount up and one nobleman even manages to break into the school.

Madame de Maintenon decides to impose stricter rules and plunges into religion in an attempt to expiate her past. She asks an abbot to help her keep students on the right Christian moral path and keep them safe from the world. Instead of turning its students into an elite for the world outside, the school falls prey to realities, cuts itself off from reality and falls apart – the film ends with its final failure and closure.

Cast
 Isabelle Huppert as Madame de Maintenon
 Jean-Pierre Kalfon as Louis XIV
 Simon Reggiani as The Abbot
 Jean-François Balmer as Racine
 Anne Marev as Madame de Brinon
 Ingrid Heiderscheidt as Sylvine de la Maisonfort
 Nina Meurisse as Lucie de Fontenelle
 Morgane Moré as Anne de Grandcamp
 Bernard Waver as Gobelin
 Jérémie Renier as François de Réans
 Jeanne Le Bigot as Lucie (child)
 Mathilde Lechasles as Anne (child)
 Alain Hinard as First soldier

Soundtrack 
The film's score was composed by Welsh composer and former member of the Velvet Underground, John Cale. The score was arranged by Randy Wolf, and released as a soundtrack album.

See also
 Isabelle Huppert on screen and stage

References

External links
 

2000 films
French historical drama films
2000s historical drama films
Films directed by Patricia Mazuy
Films scored by John Cale
Films set in the 1680s
Films set in the 1690s
Films based on French novels
Films set in boarding schools
2000 drama films
2000s French films